The Expedition of Ukasha bin Al-Mihsan was the 2nd raid on the Banu Assad bin Qhuzayma tribe, which took place in August, 627AD in 3rd month of, 6AH of the Islamic calendar.

At the order of Muhammad, a platoon of 30 Muslim fighters led by Ukasha ibn al-Mihsan was despatched to a place called Al-Ghamir inhabited by Bani Asad in the year six Hijri. The enemy immediately fled leaving behind them 200 camels which were taken to Madinah.

The 1st Raid on the Banu Asad bin Khuzaymah tribe took place 3 years earlier.

See also
List of battles of Muhammad
Military career of Muhammad
Muslim–Quraysh War

Notes

627
Campaigns ordered by Muhammad